The 2021 Shaman King anime series (stylized as SHAMAN KING) is based on the manga series of the same name written and illustrated by Hiroyuki Takei. At Otakon 2015, former Madhouse president and then MAPPA president, Masao Maruyama, expressed his desire to work on a reboot of Shaman King. In February 2017, while answering a fan's question, Takei revealed on his official Twitter that he received an offer for an anime reboot of Shaman King, but he turned the offer down because he was told that the new anime would not be able to use the first anime's voice actors and soundtrack music, although Takei hoped for another chance in the future. In June 2020, a new anime television series was announced that would adapt the 35 volumes of the new complete manga edition.

The anime is produced by Bridge and directed by Joji Furuta, with series composition by Shōji Yonemura, character designs by Satohiko Sano and music composed by Yuki Hayashi. It aired from April 1, 2021, to April 21, 2022, on TV Tokyo and various other TX Network stations. Netflix acquired global streaming rights to the series and released the first cour consisting of 13 episodes, outside Japan on August 9, 2021. The series features several returning cast members from the 2001 anime series in both the Japanese and the English dub.

As with the 2001 anime series, Megumi Hayashibara the voice actress for Anna, performs the opening and ending theme songs in the 2021 series. Soul salvation would be used for a montage in the final episode while #Boku no Yubisaki would be used over the credits of the penultimate episode. The second opening theme is "Get up! Shout!" by Tamao's voice actress Nana Mizuki, and the second ending theme is "Adieu" by Jeannes voice actress Yui Horie. Get up! Shout! would not be used at the beginning of the final episode, instead being used over the credits while highlights of the series were shown. The third ending theme is "Hazuki" by saji. The fourth ending theme is "Courage Soul" by Yohs voice actress Yōko Hikasa. Episode 5 featured the first opening theme from the 2001 anime series, "Over Soul", performed by Hayashibara, as an insert song. The ending theme of episode 33 is "Osorezan Revoir", also performed by Hayashibara.

At the end of the anime reboot's finale, it was announced that a sequel anime had been green-lit.



Episode list

Home media release
The series consists of 52 episodes released on four Blu-ray Disc boxes, each with 13 episodes: released on August 25, 2021, November 24, 2021, February 23, 2022, and May 25, 2022, respectively.

Notes

References

Shaman King (2021)
Episodes